The 2013 Open Sud de France was a tennis tournament played on indoor hard courts. It was the 26th edition of the Open Sud de France, and part of the ATP World Tour 250 Series of the 2013 ATP World Tour. It took place at the Arena Montpellier in Montpellier, France, from February 4 to February 10, 2013.

Singles main draw entrants

Seeds 

 Rankings are as of January 28, 2013.

Other entrants 
The following players received wildcards into the singles main draw:
  Julien Benneteau
  Adrian Mannarino
  Lucas Pouille

The following players received entry from the qualifying draw:
  Arnau Brugués-Davi
  Adrián Menéndez
  Guillermo Olaso
  Florent Serra

The following player received entry as a lucky loser:
  Kenny de Schepper

Withdrawals 
Before the tournament
  Roberto Bautista-Agut
  Tomáš Berdych (left wrist injury)
  Nicolas Mahut 
  Xavier Malisse
  Jürgen Zopp

Retirements 
  Viktor Troicki
  Adrian Ungur

Doubles main draw entrants

Seeds 

 Rankings are as of January 28, 2013.

Other entrants 
The following pairs received wildcards into the doubles main draw:
  Kenny de Schepper /  Fabrice Martin
  Gaël Monfils /  Josselin Ouanna

Finals

Singles 

 Richard Gasquet defeated  Benoît Paire, 6–2, 6–3

Doubles 

 Marc Gicquel /  Michaël Llodra defeated  Johan Brunström /  Raven Klaasen, 6–3, 3–6, [11–9]

References

External links 
Official website

 
O